The Village Museum formally National Museum of the Village "Dimitrie Gusti" (Muzeul Național al Satului "Dimitrie Gusti" in Romanian) is an open-air ethnographic museum located in the King Michael I Park (Bucharest, Romania), showcasing traditional Romanian village life. The museum extends to over 100,000 m2, and contains 272 authentic peasant farms and houses from all over Romania.

The village was a creation of the folklorist and sociologist Dimitrie Gusti. The location plans were executed by the writer, playwright, director Victor Ion Popa and set designer Henri H. Stahl. The necessary financial funds were provided by the Royal Cultural Foundation and in the presence of King Carol II of Romania the museum was inaugurated on May 10, 1936.

Gallery

See also
Open-air museum

External links
Official website

Museums established in 1936
Ethnographic museums in Romania
Museums in Bucharest
Historic monuments in Bucharest
Open-air museums in Romania
Rural history museums in Europe
Architecture museums
1936 establishments in Romania